Vanavarayan Vallavarayan is a 2014 Indian Tamil romantic comedy film written and directed by Rajmohan. It stars Krishna, Monal Gajjar, Ma Ka Pa Anand and Niharika Kareer. The film is set in the backdrop of rural Coimbatore. The film, features musical score by Yuvan Shankar Raja. It was released on 12 September 2014 to mixed reviews from critics.

Plot
Vanavarayan and Vallavarayan are two brothers and carefree youngsters living in Pollachi. One day, Vanavarayan meets  Anjali in a marriage and falls in love with her. In the beginning, she rejects him. Vanavarayan follows her, and she accepts his love. Their love journey goes well, until one day when they travel to Pazhani. Anjali with her lover is seen by her drunkard uncle. After this incident, Anjali's family arranges her marriage with a wealthy man Suresh. Anjali breaks down and secretly meets Vanavarayan, but the family mistakes them as they are running away. Anjali's brother beats Vanavarayan. On hearing this incident, Vallavarayan, in a drunken state, pulls Anjali's father from her house, beats him, and tears his clothes before the public. This makes Anjali hate Vanavarayan and insists he throw away his relation with Vallavarayan, then only she will marry him. Vanavarayan says that his brother is important to him than her and starts to ignore her. Vallavarayan finds that Vanavarayan is unable to forget Anjali, so he plans to reunite Vanavarayan with Anjali, but all plans go in vain. How Vallavarayan unites the pair and if Vanavarayan sacrifices his relation with his brother for his love for Anjali is the rest of the story.

Cast

 Krishna as Vanavarayan
 Ma Ka Pa Anand as Vallavarayan
 Monal Gajjar as Anjali
 Niharika Kareer
 Jayaprakash as Anjali's father
 S. P. B. Charan as Siva, Anjali's brother
 Meera Krishnan as Anjali's mother
 Sowcar Janaki as Vanavarayan & Vallavarayan's grandmother
 Thambi Ramaiah as Vanavarayan & Vallavarayan's father
 Kovai Sarala as Vanavarayan & Vallavarayan's mother
 Priya Prince as Uma, Anjali's sister-in-law
 Bava Lakshmanan
 Krishnamoorthy
 Chelladurai
 Santhanam as Suresh, Anjali's fiancé (guest appearance)

Production

Rajmohan made his directorial debut with Kunguma Poovum Konjum Puravum (2009) produced by S. P. B. Charan and soon after release it was announced that Charan would also produce the director's next venture titled Vanavarayanum Vallavarayanum starring the producer himself and Premgi Amaren in the lead roles. However the film failed to progress into production. In September 2010, it was announced that Krishna would now portray the lead role in the film which would be produced by Talking Times Movies, run by his father "Pattiyal" Sekar and Chehak Kapoor. Rajmohan announced the film's title was based on the characters played by Rajinikanth and Napoleon in the 1992 film Yejaman, However the film remained on hold for two years until the release of Krishna's Kazhugu, before production work began again in mid-2012.

TV star Ma Ka Pa Anand was selected to play a second lead role in the film, appearing as Krishna's brother. Niharika Kareer, who gained popularity with the reality show Splitsvilla, was signed and is all set to play Makapa Anand's pair. She plays a traditional Tamil girl in the film. Monal Gajjar, who has acted in a couple of Telugu films, was signed to appear in her first Tamil film after being excited by her role and the production house. Veteran actress Sowcar Janaki agreed to play a role in the film after a 15-year sabbatical and will be seen as Krishna's And Ma Ka Pa Anand's grandmother.

The film was launched on 22 June 2012, ten days after the shoot started in Nagercoil and Pollachi.

Soundtrack

The film's soundtrack is composed by Yuvan Shankar Raja, who had also scored the music for Rajmohan's previous film Kunguma Poovum Konjum Puravum. The album features six tracks and is released on 5 May 2014 at Sathyam Cinemas, Chennai.

Critical reception
The film received mixed to positive response. Behindwoods wrote "VV's recipe is clearly targeted at the rural masses and the cocktail of comedy, familial tiffs and sentiments ought to work with this target group. The male leads, Kreshna and Ma Ka Pa Anand are energetic and perform without inhibitions, with the latter's famed timing at comedy coming in handy on quite a few instances." Times of India wrote "This is a slightly outdated plot but could still work as a lighthearted entertainer. However, the problem is that director Rajamohan has difficulty in maintaining the right tone. The film often veers between juvenile humour and an anything-goes approach to heavy-duty melodrama that it becomes jarring after a point."

Box office
The film opened to 65% - 70% occupancy on first day. The film collected 4.9 crore in its first day due to the competition from Sigaram Thodu which did very well across the center. The film witnessed low on second day, it collected 3.6 crore at the box office. On third day it got better collection compared to opening and second day, it collected 5.6 crore at the box office. The film minted 12.45 crore at the box office which is very well for Krishna Kulasekaran film.

References

External links
 

2010s Tamil-language films
2014 romantic comedy films
2014 films
Indian romantic comedy films
Films scored by Yuvan Shankar Raja